Orient Express was the name of a long-distance passenger train service that ran from 1883 to 2009.

Orient Express may also refer to:

Transportation
 American Orient Express, former luxury passenger train set operating in North America 1989–2008
 Venice-Simplon Orient Express, a luxury passenger train service operating in Europe since 1982
 , former name of a cruiseferry operating in the Mediterranean 1986–1990
 Eastern and Oriental Express , a luxury passenger train service operating in Southeast Asia since 1993
 Orient Express, an automobile made by "Bergmann Industriewerken" at Gaggenau Baden in the end of the 19th century
 Orient Express, President Ronald Reagan's nickname for the Rockwell X-30 spaceplane.

Film
 Orient Express (1927 film), 1927 German silent thriller film
 Orient Express (1934 film), the film version of the novel Stamboul Train
 Orient Express (1943 film), 1943 Hungarian film
 Orient Express (1944 film), 1944 German crime film
 Orient Express (1954 film), 1954 Italian film starring Eva Bartok
 Orient Express (2004 film), Romanian film

Other uses
 Orient Express, nickname for poker player Johnny Chan
 "Orient Express", a single by Jean-Michel Jarre from Les Concerts en Chine
 Orient Express (board game), a board game set on the train
 Orient Express (magazine), an Italian comics magazine
 Orient Express (roller coaster), a former roller coaster at Worlds of Fun in Kansas City, United States 
 Orient Express (TV series), a 1953 anthology drama television series
 Orient-Express Hotels, former name of the UK-based leisure company Belmond Ltd.
 Stamboul Train, 1932 novel by Graham Greene (titled Orient Express in the US) 
 The Orient Express, a wrestling tag-team from the early 1990s

See also
 Murder on the Orient Express, 1934 Agatha Christie novel
 Murder on the Orient Express (disambiguation), various things based on the novel